David Price is an American film and television actor and musician who lives and works in Poland.

Film
In one of the few speaking roles in a nearly dialog-free film, Price played opposite Vincent Gallo's character in Jerzy Skolimowski's multi-award-winning movie Essential Killing.

Television
Price has played in Polish and German television serials and productions.

Filmography

Actor
 The Liberator (2020) Netflix miniseries
 1983 (2018) TV series – Poland
 11 Minutes (2015) feature film – Poland/Ireland
 Bogowie (2014) feature film – Poland
 Misja: Afganistan (2012) television serial – Poland
 Essential Killing (2010) feature film – Poland/Norway/Ireland/Hungary
 Sprawedliwi (2010) television serial – Poland
 Königliche Hochzeit (2010) television serial – Germany
 Londyńczycy (2009) television serial – Poland
 Teraz Albo Nigdy (2008) television serial – Poland

Music
Price is a double bass and electric bass guitar player whose most notable work has been as a member of Babatunde Olatunji's band, "Drums of Passion", from 1989 until Olatunji's death in 2003.

Discography

Albums
 Mississippi to Monterey – (1999), John "Broadway" Tucker, released on Messaround Records
 Impromptu Blue – (2000), John "Broadway" Tucker, released on Blue Movie Records
 Come Together - Live – (2005), John "Broadway" Tucker, Leszek Cichoński & Wojciech Karolak, released on Omertà Records
 Best of - Studio & Live – (2009), Leszek Cichoński, released on Midi-Max Records

Other work
General manager Esalen Institute 1995–2003

Long time staff member at the Monterey Jazz Festival (stage manager)

Further reading
David Price profiled in the following books:

External links

 
David Price at the Filmpolski Database

1963 births
American male film actors
American people of Jewish descent
Living people
Male actors from California
American male television actors
American double-bassists
Male double-bassists
Guitarists from California
American male bass guitarists
20th-century American bass guitarists
21st-century double-bassists
20th-century American male musicians
21st-century American male musicians